Lithargyrus melzeri is a species of beetle in the family Cerambycidae, the only species in the genus Lithargyrus.

References

Acanthocinini